Corp may refer to:

Surname
Aaron Corp (born 1989), American football quarterback
Brandon Corp (born 1987), American lacrosse player
Ronald Corp (born 1951), English composer, conductor and Church of England priest

Abbreviation
Corp., an abbreviation of corporation
Corp., an abbreviation of the rank (or informal form of address) of corporal (but more usually "Cpl.")
Students of Georgetown, Inc., commonly called The Corp, a non-profit charitable organization at Georgetown University in Washington, D.C.
Corporation (nightclub), Sheffield, England, referred to as "Corp" by locals

Acronym
Central Oregon and Pacific Railroad (CORP), an American Class II railroad
co-RP, a complexity class of computational complexity theory closely related to RP (complexity)

See also
Corps (disambiguation)